Werner Hippler (born July 30, 1970 in Cologne) is a former American football tight end from Germany. He played for the Cologne Centurions, but the majority of his career has been with the Frankfurt Galaxy. Hippler is the leader with the most games played in NFL Europa history.

Hippler, who played football at Burnaby, British Columbia High School in Canada
before moving with his father to California. He played in College
at Sacramento State for the Division I-AA Hornets in the backfield 
with future 12-year CFL RB Troy Mills and future Arena Football League star
QB Aaron Garcia. Hippler signed with the San Diego Chargers and
spent two years on their practice squad. He later went a full
camp with the Detroit Lions and played one year in the short-lived XFL 
for the Las Vegas Outlaws. Through 2007 he had played 14 season of Pro Football.

Hippler has small roles in two very popular European movies of the popular
genre: The Clown and Straight Shooter, opposite Dennis Hopper. He runs a
security company in Germany called 'Rhein Security' with his football agent
and trained for three months in Israel with the ISS. He is married to Kirshen
and they have one son named Dennis (born 12/12/97).

On November 21, 2017, Hippler replaced team founder Martin Sieg on the board of the German Football League's Hamburg Huskies in order for Sieg to focus on the team's marketing and sponsorship.

External links
 http://www.nfl.com/news/story/9307191
 http://www.rhein-security.de
 https://www.abendblatt.de/sport/article212439413/Neuer-Huskies-Chef-traeumt-von-Football-am-Millerntor.html
 http://www.gfl.info/2017/10/25/anthony-rouzier-wird-neuer-huskies-headcoach-2-2/

1970 births
Living people
American players of American football
American players of Canadian football
Cologne Centurions (NFL Europe) players
Frankfurt Galaxy players
Las Vegas Outlaws (XFL) players
Sacramento State Hornets football players
Sportspeople from California
Sportspeople from Cologne